Ashti Assembly constituency is one of the 288 Vidhan Sabha (legislative assembly) constituencies of Maharashtra state in western India.

Overview
Ashti (constituency number 231) is one of the six Vidhan Sabha constituencies located in Beed district. It covers the entire Ashti and Patoda tehsils and part of the Shirur tehsil of this district.

Ashti is part of the Beed Lok Sabha constituency along with all other Vidhan Sabha segments in this district, namely Parli, Majalgaon, Georai, Beed and Kaij.

Members of Vidhan Sabha 
 2009 : Suresh Dhas, NCP
 2014 : Bhimrao Dhonde, BJP
 2019 :Balasaheb Ajabe, NCP

See also
 Ashti,Patoda,Shirur(kasar) Beed
 List of constituencies of Maharashtra Vidhan Sabha

References

Assembly constituencies of Maharashtra